The Computer Assisted Passenger Prescreening System II (CAPPS II) was a program of the United States Department of Homeland Security (DHS) instituted to increase security at airports by assessing the risk level of passengers before they're allowed to board. CAPPS II searched through information stored in government and commercial databases and assigned a color-coded level of risk to each passenger. Amid controversy from such organizations as the American Civil Liberties Union (ACLU), the Electronic Privacy Information Center (EPIC), and the Electronic Frontier Foundation (EFF), the program was terminated by President Bush in August 2004. The program was then replaced by a similar program called Secure Flight in early 2005 generating the same concerns over privacy and civil liberties. However, due to public concerns, Secure Flight did not become operational until 2010. CAPPS II grounded innocent Americans due to false positives. One notable example is the grounding of Senator Ted Kennedy in 2004.

See also
 Computer Assisted Passenger Prescreening System (CAPPS I)

References

External links
ACLU's page on CAPPS II
EPIC's Page on Passenger Prescreening Programs
EFF's Page on CAPPS II
Senator Kennedy's grounding by CNN.com

United States Department of Homeland Security
Legal issues related to the September 11 attacks
Counterterrorism in the United States
Mass surveillance
Privacy in the United States
Surveillance